The following are airports serving the Cape Town area.

List

See also
List of airports in South Africa

References 

South African Air Force Bases

External links
 Lists of airports in South Africa:
 Great Circle Mapper
 FallingRain.com
 Aircraft Charter World
 The Airport Guide
 World Aero Data
 A-Z World Airports
 Cape Town International Airport home page
 AFB Ysterplaat

Transport in Cape Town
Airports in South Africa
Airports
Airports, Cape Town
Airports, Cape Town